The 1977–78 St. John's Redmen basketball team represented St. John's University during the 1977–78 NCAA Division I men's basketball season. The team was coached by Lou Carnesecca in his tenth year at the school. St. John's home games are played at Alumni Hall and Madison Square Garden.

Roster

Schedule and results

|-
!colspan=9 style="background:#FF0000; color:#FFFFFF;"| Exhibition

|-
!colspan=9 style="background:#FF0000; color:#FFFFFF;"| Regular season

|-
!colspan=9 style="background:#FF0000; color:#FFFFFF;"| ECAC Metro tournament

|-
!colspan=9 style="background:#FF0000; color:#FFFFFF;"| NCAA tournament

Team players drafted into the NBA

References

St. John's Red Storm men's basketball seasons
St. John's
St. John's
St John
St John